Clarendon North Central is a parliamentary constituency represented in the House of Representatives of the Jamaican Parliament. It elects one Member of Parliament (MP) by the first past the post system of election. It is located in Clarendon Parish.

Representation 
 Pearnel Charles (JLP)  2002 to 2020
 Robert Nesta Morgan (JLP) from 2020

References 

Parliamentary constituencies of Jamaica